Brad Byron Cornett (born February 4, 1969) is an American former professional baseball pitcher. Cornett played for the Toronto Blue Jays of Major League Baseball (MLB) for parts of the 1994 and 1995 seasons.

Signed by the Blue Jays as an undrafted free agent out of Lubbock Christian University in 1992, Cornett made his major league debut in just his third season of professional baseball.

External links
, or Retrosheet, or Pura Pelota (VPBL stats)

1969 births
Living people
American expatriate baseball players in Canada
Baseball players from Texas
Bridgeport Bluefish players
Dunedin Blue Jays players
Durham Bulls players
El Paso Diablos players
Hagerstown Suns players
Knoxville Smokies players
Lehigh Valley Black Diamonds players
Leones del Caracas players
American expatriate baseball players in Venezuela
Louisville Redbirds players
Lubbock Christian Chaparrals baseball players
Lubbock Christian University alumni
Major League Baseball pitchers
People from Lamesa, Texas
St. Catharines Blue Jays players
Syracuse Chiefs players
Syracuse SkyChiefs players
Tiburones de La Guaira players
Toronto Blue Jays players
Tucson Sidewinders players
American expatriate baseball players in Australia